Miss Tahiti is a French Polynesian beauty pageant which selects a representative for the Miss France national competition from the overseas country of French Polynesia. Despite its name, women from all of French Polynesia are eligible to compete, not solely those from Tahiti. Miss Tahiti has been held annually since 1960.

The current Miss Tahiti is Herenui Tuheiava, who was crowned Miss Tahiti 2022 on 24 June 2022. Five women from French Polynesia have been crowned Miss France:
Edna Tepava, who was crowned Miss France 1974
Thilda Fuller, who was crowned Miss France 1980, and later resigned
Mareva Georges, who was crowned Miss France 1991
Mareva Galanter, who was crowned Miss France 1999
Vaimalama Chaves, who was crowned Miss France 2019

Results summary
Miss France: Edna Tepava (1973); Thilda Fuller (1979; resigned); Mareva Georges (1990); Mareva Galanter (1998); Vaimalama Chaves (2018)
1st Runner-Up: Jeanne Burns (1971); Hinarani de Longeaux (2012); Mehiata Riaria (2013); Hinarere Taputu (2014)
2nd Runner-Up: Mira Vahiatua (1974); Moea Amiot (1975); Teumere Pater (1988); Vaimiti Teiefitu (2015); Vaea Ferrand (2016); Matahari Bousquet (2019)
3rd Runner-Up: Hinano Teanotoga (1997); Tumateata Buisson (2021)
4th Runner-Up: Heitiare Tribondeau (2003); Raipoe Adams (2004)
6th Runner-Up: Timia Pascaline Teriiero (1977)

Titleholders

Notes

References

External links

Miss France regional pageants
Beauty pageants in French Polynesia
Women in French Polynesia